Belgium was represented in the Eurovision Song Contest 1957, on 3 March 1957, by Bobbejaan Schoepen with the song "", written by Harry Frekin and Eric Franssen and performed in Dutch. The song was chosen during a national final with Schoepen performing all entries.

Before Eurovision

De T.V Maakt Muziek 

De T.V. Maakt Muziek was the national final format developed by NIR in order to select Belgium's entry for the Eurovision Song Contest 1957. The competition was held on 19 February 1957 at 20:45 CET at Studio 6 at the Flageyplein in Brussels. The show was also broadcast in Netherlands on NTS. All three competing songs were performed by Bobbejaan Schoepen, and "Straatdeuntje" was selected as the winning song by an "expert" jury.

Competing entries 
Competing entries were selected by an "expert" jury panel from 7 shortlisted songs.

Final 

The final was held on 19 February 1957. "" was selected by the jury as the winning song and would become Belgium's third entry in the Eurovision Song Contest (as every country had two songs in the 1956 competition) and the first song submitted by the Flemish broadcaster as well as the first Belgian entry performed in Dutch. The jury panel, which voted in the final consisted of: Marcel Put (composer; jury chairperson), Nic Bal (journalist), Francis Bay (conductor), Robert Bosmans, Bob Boon (TV presenter and producer), Léonce Gras (NIR's musical director), Jacques Kruger (musical manager), Albert Rollewagen (music publisher), Paul Van Dessel (NIR's TV director), Gert Mertens and Renaat Verbruggen (baritone singer).

At Eurovision 
At the Eurovision Song Contest in Frankfurt, the Belgian entry was the first of the night preceding . Reflecting the song title, the stage was showing the picture of a street in the background. Schoepen delivered, as usual in these days, a simple performance which was remarkable because of the large whistling part in his song. At the close of voting, Belgium had received five points in total; the country finished shared eight among the ten participants. The Belgian jury gave half of its points, five, to the winning country, the Netherlands.

Voting 
Every country had a jury of ten people. Every jury member could give one point to his or her favourite song. Among the jury members was Francis Bay, who would go on to conduct the Belgian entry at Eurovision in nine future edition of the contest.

Sources 
 Jan Feddersen: Ein Lied kann eine Brücke sein. Die deutsche und internationale Geschichte des Grand Prix Eurovision. Hoffmann und Campe, Hamburg 2002, ISBN 3-455-09350-7.

References 

1957
Countries in the Eurovision Song Contest 1957
Eurovision Song Contest